Spirit House may refer to:

 Spirit house, a miniature house for spirits in Southeast Asia
 Spirit house (Dakelh), a ritual structure among the Dakelh of British Columbia, Canada
 Spirit House (Georgetown, New York), a historic house in Georgetown, New York, US
 Spirit House (album), an album by Jemeel Moondoc
 The Spirit House, a 1993 young-adult novel by William Sleator
 Spirit House, a 2011 book by Mark Dapin